Richard Bruce Snodgrass is an American writer and photographer known for his evocations of life in small-town and rural western Pennsylvania. His published work includes fiction, nonfiction, and photography.

Early life and education
Richard Bruce Snodgrass was born on April 22, 1940, in Beaver Falls, Pennsylvania, to Bruce DeWitt Snodgrass and Helen (née Murchie) Snodgrass. His parents were both United Presbyterians of Scottish descent, and both graduated from Tarkio College, in northwestern Missouri. His father was a founding partner of a prominent accounting firm in Pittsburgh, and his mother was trained as a teacher. Snodgrass’s older brother, W. D. Snodgrass was a poet.

In addition to his brother, Snodgrass had two older siblings—sisters Shirley (1937–2016) and Barbara (1928–1955). Barbara’s death, at the age of twenty-seven, from a coronary thrombosis aggravated by a chronic asthma-like condition is the subject of a series of poems by W. D. Snodgrass. The family lived in the College Hill neighborhood of Beaver Falls. The orange-brick house with distinctive rounded corners and curved windows is the subject of a collection of photographs Snodgrass took in the 1970s. 

In 1959, Snodgrass enrolled in Saint Vincent College, then transferred to the University of Detroit and audited classes at Wayne State University. He then enrolled in the University of California at Berkeley, where he majored in English literature. He graduated with a BA in 1963.

Snodgrass subsequently studied with and assisted the renowned photographer Oliver Gagliani at his workshops in Virginia City, Nevada. He received his MFA in photography from the California College of Arts and Crafts in 1973.

Career

Writing
Snodgrass’s first novel, There’s Something in the Back Yard, was published by Viking in 1989. The book earned critical praise from the Washington Post Book World, the Christian Science Monitor, and the Los Angeles Times, among other publications. His short fiction has been published in the New England Review/Bread Loaf Quarterly, California Quarterly, Pittsburgh Quarterly, and elsewhere.  His essay on Ross Macdonald appeared in South Dakota Review.  As a fiction writer, he was artist in residence at the Helene Wurlitzer Foundation, in Taos, New Mexico. He also received a fellowship from the Pennsylvania Council on the Arts. 

In 2011, Carnegie Mellon University Press published An Uncommon Field: The Flight 93 Temporary Memorial, a collection of photographs and meditations about the now-dismantled structure on the site that later became a national park in Shanksville, Pennsylvania.  Skyhorse Publishing brought out Kitchen Things: An Album of Vintage Utensils and Farm-Kitchen Recipes in 2013.  The New York Times called it a book “to admire,”  and the Associated Press named it one of the year’s “best books to get you thinking about food.”  The book grew out of a series of articles Snodgrass wrote for Pittsburgh’s Table magazine, where he was a regular contributor. 

Snodgrass’s series of novels set in the fictional town of Furnass, Pennsylvania, begins with The Building, published in April of 2018 by Calling Crow Press. Other novels in the series are Some Rise, All Fall Down, Across the River, Holding On (short stories), Shadow of the Valley, The Pattern Maker, and House of Lyles, all set for release by Calling Crow Press between 2018 and 2020.

Photography
Snodgrass was artist in residence at the Syracuse University’s Light Work program in 1977. His photographs are in the Oakland Museum of California, where he served as special curator and printer for a Dorothea Lange exhibition. In 2006, an exhibition called AfterImage: Mill Life Remembered, consisting of eighty of his photographs and twenty accompanying text panels, was exhibited at the Heinz History Center, an affiliate of the Smithsonian Institution, in Pittsburgh.  His photography has also appeared in LensWork magazine.

Bibliography

References

External links
 

1940 births
Living people
20th-century American photographers
21st-century American photographers
21st-century American male writers
20th-century American male writers
Photographers from Pennsylvania
Novelists from Pennsylvania
People from Beaver Falls, Pennsylvania
Saint Vincent College alumni
University of Detroit Mercy alumni
University of California, Berkeley alumni
American male novelists
20th-century American novelists
21st-century American novelists
California College of the Arts alumni